Yığılca District is a district of the Düzce Province of Turkey. Its seat is the town of Yığılca. Its area is 636 km2, and its population is 13,915 (2022).

Composition
There is one municipality in Yığılca District:
 Yığılca

There are 39 villages in Yığılca District:

 Akçaören
 Aksaklar
 Asar
 Aydınyayla
 Bekirler
 Çamlı
 Çiftlikköy
 Çukurören
 Dibektaş
 Doğanlar
 Dutlar
 Gaziler
 Gelenöz
 Geriş
 Gökçeağaç
 Güney
 Hacılar
 Hacıyeri
 Hebeler
 Hocaköy
 Hocatman
 Hoşafoğlu
 İğneler
 Karakaş
 Kırık
 Kocaoğlu
 Köseler
 Mengen
 Naşlar
 Orhangazi
 Redifler
 Sarıkaya
 Tıraşlar
 Tuğrul
 Yağcılar
 Yaylatepe
 Yeniyer
 Yılgı
 Yoğunpelit

References

Districts of Düzce Province